The Türkiye Korumalı Futbol Ligi (TKFL) is a professional American football league in Turkey.

History 
The development of American football in Turkey can be traced to the beginning of 1987, when American Navy men played a pickup game against Turkish students at Bogazici University in Istanbul. Boğaziçi Filler (later renamed Sultans) was founded in 1987, and the Bullets were founded in 1993 in Hacettepe (later named Red Deers after the university logo). Istanbul Technical (Hornets) and Marmara University (Sharks) teams were added during 1995-1996. However, the Marmara Sharks folded in 1998. In 2010, the number of club teams exceeded 13 and the number of universities over 24.

The first official match between two Turkish teams was played between the Boğaziçi Elephants and Istanbul Pistof in 1993. The Elephants won this match 28-0. The name "Elephants" was later changed to "Sultans". After the 1995-1996 season, in line with the increase in the number of teams, the American Football League began to be organized according to the qualifying league fixture among universities. In the following years, the Hacettepe Red Deers, ITU Hornets, Marmara Sharks, METU Falcons, Ankara Cats, Gazi Warriors, Ege Dolphins, and Yeditepe Eagles university teams were also established. However, during these years, matches were played lacking the basic requirements of American football. The teams started buying proper equipment in 2001, and American football in Turkey took on a more professional structure. After Bilkent Judges, Boğaziçi Sultans became the second team to have specialized equipment. The first match with this equipment was played in Ankara in 2001, with the Sultans winning 34-0. The Turkey American Football League was launched on 26 November 2005. Since the 2007-2008 season, American football competition has happened in two categories, the Professional League and the University League.

Seasons

Teams

Türkiye Korumalı Futbol Ligi Teams (Pro League)

Notes

References 

 

American football in Turkey
American football leagues in Europe
American football leagues in Turkey